Ijdan (also Romanized as Ījdān) is a village in Behnamvasat-e Jonubi Rural District, Javadabad District, Varamin County, Tehran Province, Iran. At the 2006 census, its population was 55, in 18 families.

References 

Populated places in Varamin County